Don't Fence Me In may refer to:

 "Don't Fence Me In" (song), a song written by Cole Porter and Robert Fletcher
 Don't Fence Me In (Decca album), a 1946 78 rpm album with Bing Crosby and the Andrews Sisters
 Don't Fence Me In (Lari White album), 1996 album by Lari White
 "Don't Fence Me In" (Dad's Army), episode of the British television series Dad's Army
 Don't Fence Me In (film), a 1945 film starring Roy Rogers
 "Don't Fence Me In", episode of the British television series Goodnight Sweetheart